Northgate is an unincorporated community in Burke County, North Dakota, United States. The community is adjacent to the U.S. border with Canada, and it shares its name with the neighboring Canadian settlement of Northgate, Saskatchewan. The community is served by North Dakota Highway 8. Northgate had its own post office until 1985.

The former Port of Entry building was razed in 2014–2015 for unknown reasons. Almost all of Northgate, Saskatchewan, was razed in 2013–2014 to make room for an extension of the Canadian National Railway.

See also
 Northgate Border Crossing

References

Unincorporated communities in Burke County, North Dakota
Unincorporated communities in North Dakota